The Festival Theatre was a theatre in Paignton, Devon, England.

Opened in 1967, the Festival Theatre was a seafront theatre located on the Paignton Esplanade, capable of staging large summer shows. It was in direct competition with the Princess and Pavilion theatres in Torquay.

The theatre closed at the end of 1998, and the building re-opened in October 1999 as a multiscreen cinema, known as the Apollo. Since the closure of the Festival Theatre, the  Palace Theatre in Palace Avenue, a smaller venue, has taken over as the main theatre in Paignton.

Summer shows staged 
 1971 Leslie Crowther, Basil Brush, Larry Grayson, John Hanson 
 1974 Black and White Minstrels with Don McClane
 1975 Ronnie Corbett, Kenneth Mckellar, Keith Harris
 1976 Black and White Minstrels with Roy Hudd
 1977 Tommy Steele, Cool Breeze, Lennie Bennett
 1978 Freddie Starr, Roy Walker, Lynn Paul, Paul Ridgeway, Pamela Davis Dancers
 1980 Tom O'Connor
 1981 Freddie Starr 
 1981 Dana; the show transferred from Babbacombe Theatre
 1982 Danny La Rue 
 1988 The Cannon and Ball Show with Allan Stewart, The Three Degrees, Domino, The Mike Ryal Orchestra and The Brian Rogers Dancers
 1989 Les Dawson
 1997 Bradley Walsh

References

External links
 

Theatres in Devon
Buildings and structures in Paignton